Antiguraleus abnormis is an extinct species of sea snail, a marine gastropod mollusk in the family Mangeliidae.

A.G. Beu (2009) adopted Probebela for all the southern hemisphere taxa previously referred to Antiguraleus.

Description
The length of the shell attains 6.5 mm.

(Original description) The spire of this minute and mitriform shell is produced and acute. It contains 6½ whorls, the first 1½ whorls are embryonic and polished. The others are angled, strongly longitudinally costate and delicately spirally lined. There are 11 longitudinal ribs on a whorl, which are crossed by three or four spiral threads in front of the angle, none behind it. On the body whorl, the spiral threads in front of the angle are about twelve, some of which are stronger than the others. The aperture is linear. The outer lip is rather thick nut not grooved. There is a posterior shallow sinus above the angle. The columella is smooth.

Distribution
This extinct marine species occurred in New Zealand.

References

 Hutton, Frederick Wollaston.1885: Descriptions of new Tertiary shells. Transactions of the New Zealand Institute 17: 313–332
 Maxwell, P.A. (2009). Cenozoic Mollusca. pp. 232–254 in Gordon, D.P. (ed.) New Zealand inventory of biodiversity. Volume one. Kingdom Animalia: Radiata, Lophotrochozoa, Deuterostomia. Canterbury University Press, Christchurch.

abnormis
Gastropods described in 1885